Robertus mazaurici is a species of araneomorph spider in the family Theridiidae first described by Eugène Simon in 1901.

Etymology
This species was named in honor of the French speleologist and archeologist Félix Mazauric, a conservator at the Archeological Museum of Nîmes (1909-1919), who captured the first specimen in 1901.

Distribution
R. mazaurici is endemic to France, and has been reported from Gard, Ariège, Pyrénées-Orientales, and Haute-Loire.

References

Theridiidae
Spiders of Europe
Spiders described in 1901